"The Times They Are a-Changin'" is a song written by Bob Dylan and released as the title track of his 1964 album of the same name. Dylan wrote the song as a deliberate attempt to create an anthem of change for the time, influenced by Irish and Scottish ballads. Released as a 45-rpm single in Britain in 1965, it reached number 9 on the UK Singles Chart. The song was not released as a single in the U.S. In 2019 it was certified Silver by BPI.

Ever since its release, the song has been influential to people's views on society, with critics noting the universal lyrics as contributing to the song's lasting message of change. Dylan has occasionally performed it in concert. The song has been covered by many different artists, including Nina Simone; Josephine Baker; the Byrds; the Seekers; Peter, Paul and Mary; Tracy Chapman; Simon & Garfunkel; Runrig; the Beach Boys; Joan Baez; Phil Collins; Billy Joel; Bruce Springsteen; Me First and the Gimme Gimmes; Brandi Carlile; and Burl Ives. The song was ranked number 59 on Rolling Stone's 2004 list of the "500 Greatest Songs of All Time".

Inspiration and composition
Dylan appears to have written the song in September and October 1963. He recorded it as a Witmark publishing demo at that time, a version that was later released on The Bootleg Series Volumes 1–3 (Rare & Unreleased) 1961–1991. The song was then recorded at the Columbia studios in New York on October 23 and 24; the latter session yielded the version that became the title song of Dylan's third album. The a- in the song title is an archaic intensifying prefix, as in the British songs "A-Hunting We Will Go" and "Here We Come a-Wassailing", from the 18th and 19th century.

Dylan recalled writing the song as a deliberate attempt to create an anthem of change for the moment. In 1985, he told Cameron Crowe, "This was definitely a song with a purpose. It was influenced of course by the Irish and Scottish ballads ...'Come All Ye Bold Highway Men', 'Come All Ye Tender Hearted Maidens'. I wanted to write a big song, with short concise verses that piled up on each other in a hypnotic way. The civil rights movement and the folk music movement were pretty close for a while and allied together at that time."

Dylan biographer Clinton Heylin describes how musician Tony Glover stopped by Dylan's apartment in September 1963, picked up a page of the song Dylan was working on, and read a line from it: "Come senators, congressmen, please heed the call."  "Turning to Dylan, Glover said, 'What is this shit, man?' Dylan shrugged his shoulders and replied, 'Well, you know, it seems to be what the people want to hear.

Critic Michael Gray called it "the archetypal protest song." Gray commented, "Dylan's aim was to ride upon the unvoiced sentiment of a mass public—to give that inchoate sentiment an anthem and give its clamour an outlet. He succeeded, but the language of the song is nevertheless imprecisely and very generally directed." Gray suggested that the song has been made obsolete by the very changes that it predicted and hence was politically out of date almost as soon as it was written.

Literary critic Christopher Ricks suggested that "the song transcends the political preoccupations of the time in which it was written". Ricks argued in 2003 that Dylan was still performing the song, and when he sang "Your sons and your daughters / Are beyond your command", he "sang inescapably with the accents not of a son, no longer perhaps primarily a parent, but with the attitude of a grandfather." Ricks concluded, "Once upon a time it may have been a matter of urging square people to accept the fact that their children were, you know, hippies. But the capacious urging could then come to mean that ex-hippie parents had better accept that their children look like becoming yuppies. And then Republicans..."

Critic Andy Gill points out that the song's lyrics echo lines from the Book of Ecclesiastes, which Pete Seeger adapted to create his anthem "Turn, Turn, Turn!". The climactic line about the first later being last, likewise, is a direct scriptural reference to Mark 10:31: "But many that are first shall be last, and the last first."

Less than a month after Dylan recorded the song, President Kennedy was assassinated in Dallas, Texas, on November 22, 1963. The next night, Dylan opened a concert with "The Times They Are a-Changin; he told biographer Anthony Scaduto, "I thought, 'Wow, how can I open with that song? I'll get rocks thrown at me.' But I had to sing it, my whole concert takes off from there. I know I had no understanding of anything. Something had just gone haywire in the country and they were applauding the song. And I couldn't understand why they were clapping, or why I wrote the song. I couldn't understand anything. For me, it was just insane."

The Byrds' version

"The Times They Are a-Changin'" was one of two Dylan covers that the Byrds included on their second album, Turn! Turn! Turn!, with "Lay Down Your Weary Tune" being the other. Like other Dylan compositions that the band had covered, such as "Mr. Tambourine Man" and "All I Really Want to Do", the song was intended to be the A-side of a single. It was sung by bandleader Jim McGuinn and prominently features his signature twelve-string Rickenbacker guitar. The song was often played at concerts surrounding its release.

The recording sessions have been noted for the surprise appearances made by George Harrison and Paul McCartney in the control booth, which according to Byrd members prevented them from completing the session and the track effectively. Columbia Records originally pressed thousands of cover sleeves for the intended single, but the Byrds' manager, Jim Dickson, asked for the release to be dropped because of the group's dissatisfaction, most vocally expressed by David Crosby; Dickson originally thought the song would have made a strong single. In a 2004 interview, Chris Hillman stated his dislike for the song, suggesting that "we shouldn't have bothered with that song". Another version of the song, recorded in June, is a bonus track on the 1996 reissue. "Turn! Turn! Turn!" ended up becoming the band's third single, reaching number 1 on the U.S. Billboard Hot 100 chart and number 26 on the UK Singles Chart.

The Byrds performed the song on the U.S. television program Hullabaloo, but it failed to make a long-term impact. CBS England issued "The Times They Are a-Changin" as the lead track of an EP, along with "Set You Free This Time", written by Gene Clark, which was moderately successful. In addition to its appearance on the Byrds' second album, "The Times They Are a-Changin" is included on several Byrds compilations, including The Byrds' Greatest Hits Volume II, The Very Best of The Byrds, The Byrds, The Essential Byrds, There Is a Season, and The Byrds Play Dylan.

Later history

In January 1984, a young Steve Jobs recited the second verse of "The Times They Are a-Changin'" in his opening of the 1984 Apple shareholders meeting, where he famously unveiled the Macintosh computer for the first time.

The "Dylan Covers Database" listed 436 recordings, including bootlegs, of this song as of October 19, 2009. According to the same database, the song has been recorded in at least 14 other languages, such as Catalán, Czech, Dutch, Finnish, French, German, Hungarian, Italian, Japanese, Norwegian, Polish, Serbian, Spanish, and Swedish.

Hip hop group Public Enemy reference it in their 2007 Dylan tribute song "Long and Whining Road": "It's been a long and whining road, even though time keeps a-changin' / I'm a bring it all back home".

In 2009, the filmmaker Michael Moore sang the third verse of the song live on The Jay Leno Show after being told that he had to "earn" a clip from his film Capitalism: A Love Story to be shown.

On December 10, 2010, Dylan's hand-written lyrics of the song were sold at auction at Sotheby's, in New York, for $422,500. They were purchased by a hedge fund manager.

The song is included in "The 500 Songs That Shaped Rock and Roll", a permanent exhibit at the Rock and Roll Hall of Fame.

Billy Bragg covered the song but altered the lyrics to make it a protest song dealing with the issues of 2017. Bragg sang lyrics such as "Accept it that soon you'll be drenched to the bone/For the climate is obviously changing," and "But the man in the White House says no one's to blame/For the times, they are a-changing back."

A cover of the song by singer Susan Calloway was used in a commercial for the 2022 Stanley Cup Finals. The commercial featured an edited sequence of handoffs of the Stanley Cup between notable former Cup winning players with Calloway's version accompanying.

Notes

References

External links
Lyrics at Bob Dylan's official website

Songs written by Bob Dylan
Bob Dylan songs
The Byrds songs
1964 songs
1965 singles
Song recordings produced by Tom Wilson (record producer)
Columbia Records singles
Articles containing video clips
Political songs